Sir William MacLellan, son of Patrick MacLellan of Bombie and Margaret Of Lennox was the Husband of Lady Marion Carlyle.

When his father was murdered in 1452, William along with other members of his clan in revenge ransacked land owned by William Douglas, 8th Earl of Douglas but their plundering was punished in defiance of all law and justice, for which king James II outlawed and forbid. As a result of their outburst, the estate of Bombie was taken from the Maclellan clan thereupon annexed to the crown. The Maclellans despite their grievance with the King over Bombie where ever faithful to the crown during this time were among the beneficiaries of the redistribution of wealth and titles and would receive key positions in the years that would follow.

William is best known for dispatching Black Morrow, sometimes referred to as Black Murray, either a Romani/Scottish Traveller, a Moor, a Saracen, or an Irishman who was terrorizing the area that prompted James II of Scotland to promise the Barony to Kirkcudbright to the Maclellan family should William capture the man’s body, dead or alive.

Hoping to restore honor and favor to their clan. William gathered his followers and defeated the band of marauders carrying the beheaded of their leader Black Murray on the end of his sword to King James to prove the success of what was asked. The King in his delight commended William for his deed but whether purposely or not forgot to mention the reward that was promised.

Enraged, William took off his gauntlet and threw it at the King’s feet whilst shaking his fist he beseeched the king to "Think on!" and not to forget his proclamation. Subsequently, William Maclellan was Knighted, the borough of Kirkcudbright was made Royal Burgh, and Sir William became its first Provost.

The crest which the new provost was an erect right arm grasping a dagger, on the point of which was Black Morrow's head. The motto of the MacLellan Clan has forevermore been "Think On!"

He would later serve the Kings successor James III of Scotland.

See also
Clan MacLellan

References

http://archiver.rootsweb.com/th/read/MCLELLAN/2007-08/1187774835 Retrieved 20 January 2008.

15th-century Scottish people
Clan MacLellan